Racinoa signicosta is a moth in the Bombycidae family. It was described by Embrik Strand in 1910. It is found in Tanzania and possibly Ethiopia.

References

Natural History Museum Lepidoptera generic names catalog

Bombycidae
Moths described in 1910